Breaking News is a 2004 Hong Kong action film produced and directed by Johnnie To, and starring Richie Jen, Kelly Chen, Nick Cheung, Eddie Cheung, Simon Yam and Maggie Shiu. The film premiered out of competition at the 2004 Cannes Film Festival.

Plot
The Hong Kong Police finds itself in a public relations crisis after a disastrous shootout and the scene of a police officer surrendering in apparent fear to the mobsters was captured and telecast by the local media. Inspector Cheung and his crew are assigned to the task of catching these mobsters, led by the intelligent and resourceful Yuen.

In the meantime, Superintendent Rebecca Fong leads an effort on the part of the Hong Kong Police to mislead the media and salvage the reputation of the police team. She sees the chance in a raid on the mobsters hiding out in an apartment, while Inspector Cheung leads his own team to search for the mobsters, with many gunfights breaking out in between.

Yuen hides out in the apartment of Yip, a bumbling taxi driver and single father of two. With the reluctant help of Yip's computer whiz son, he plays an intricate cat and mouse game with the police, releasing suspicious images of the police being defeated to the media. Superintendent Fong thwarts the effort with tricks of her own, including releasing a sumptuous packed lunch to the numerous squads on duty. After PTU officers were defeated in the first raid attempt, SDU operators were called in to flush out Yuen and his fellow mobsters.

Inspector Cheung successfully tracks down Yuen, though he is defeated only after a high-octane chase and gunfight sequence, with Fong held hostage.

Cast
 Richie Jen as Yuen
 Kelly Chen as Superintendent Rebecca Fong
 Nick Cheung as Inspector Cheung
 Eddie Cheung as Eric Yeung
 Benz Hui as Hoi
 Lam Suet as Yip
 You Yong as Chun
 Ding Haifeng as Lung
 Li Haitao as Chung
 Simon Yam as Asst. Commissioner Wong (special appearance)
 Alan Chui Chung-San as Chun's target
 Maggie Shiu as Grace Chow (special appearance)
 Wong Chi-wai as Wang
 Wong Wah-wo as White Hair

Awards and nominations

Remakes
A remake called Goryachie Novosti (international title: Newsmakers) has been shot in Russia. It is produced by Moscow-based Tandem Pictures and Gothenburg's Illusion Film and helmed by young Swedish director Anders Banke. The Russian/Swedish version of Breaking News was theatrically released in Russia and ex-USSR on 7 May 2009.

See also
 List of Hong Kong films
 Johnnie To filmography

References

External links

2004 films
2004 action films
Hong Kong action films
2000s Cantonese-language films
Films directed by Johnnie To
Media Asia films
Milkyway Image films
Police detective films
Films whose director won the Best Director Golden Horse Award
Films set in Hong Kong
Films shot in Hong Kong
2000s police procedural films
2000s Hong Kong films